Jennie Adams (born Jennifer Ann Ryan; 1963 in New South Wales, Australia) is an Australian writer of romance novels since 2005. She is a Waldenbooks bestseller and Romantic Times Reviewers' Choice Award winner. She has sold hundreds of thousands of her novels in over a dozen foreign-languages in countries as South Africa, Spain, Poland, Russia, India, and Japan. She also has had articles and short stories published in magazines and periodicals in Australia and overseas and children's publications.

Biography
Jennifer Ann Ryan was born in 1963 in a small country town in New South Wales, Australia. She had three adult children.  She worked part-time in the health care industry. She obtained an accreditation in Writing Studies from The Writing School. She is active in encouraging Aboriginal artists.

Bibliography

Single novels
The Boss's Convenient Bride (2005/Mar)
Parents of Convenience (2005/Jun)
Memo: Marry Me? (2007/May)
To Love And To Cherish (2008/Jan)
Promoted: Secretary to Bride! (2008/Nov)
Nine-to-Five Bride (2009/Fev)
What's A Housekeeper To Do? (2010/Jun)
Passionate Chef, Ice Queen Boss (2010/Sep)
Daycare Mum to Wife (2011/2) a.k.a. Daycare Mom to Wife
Once Upon a Time in Tarrula (2011/Sep) a.k.a. His Plain-Jane Cinderella
Invitation to the Prince's Palace (2012)

Gable Sisters
Her Millionaire Boss (2006/Aug)
The Italian Single Dad (2007/Jul)
The Boss's Unconventional Assistant (2007/Oct)

MacKay Brothers
Australian Boss: Diamond Ring (2009/Dec)
Surprise: Outback Proposal (2011/Jan)

References

External links 
Jennie Adams at Harlequin

1963 births
Australian romantic fiction writers
Living people
Women romantic fiction writers
Australian women novelists